Jung Sang-jin (born 16 April 1984 in Seoul) is a South Korean javelin thrower.

His personal best throw is 82.05 metres, achieved in June 2012 in Daejeon.

Achievements

Seasonal bests by year
2006 - 76.85
2007 - 75.34
2008 - 75.75
2009 - 79.69
2010 - 80.89
2011 - 80.38
2012 - 82.05
2013 - 77.60
2014 - 74.84
2015 - 75.36

References

1984 births
Living people
South Korean male javelin throwers
Athletes (track and field) at the 2010 Asian Games
Athletes (track and field) at the 2012 Summer Olympics
Asian Games competitors for South Korea
Sportspeople from Seoul
21st-century South Korean people